Sauterina hofmanniella is a moth of the family Gracillariidae. It is found from Scandinavia to the Pyrenees, Sardinia, Italy and Romania and from France to central Russia.

The larvae feed on Lathyrus niger. They mine the leaves of their host plant. The mine consists of a strongly contracted lower-surface tentiform mine. The lower epidermis is often torn. Pupation takes place on the outside of the mine.

References

Acrocercopinae
Moths of Europe
Moths of Asia
Moths described in 1867